The 1994 FIA Asia-Pacific Touring Car Championship was a motorsport championship for Super Touring racing cars. This was the second running of the championship and the champion was Joachim Winkelhock who drove for Schnitzer Motorsport.

Schedule
The original schedule contained six rounds, but due to logistical and financial problems, only three rounds, Japan, Macau and New Zealand were run. The Japanese round was also part of that year's JTCC schedule.

Original schedule:

Teams and drivers
Teams and drivers list:

References
 1994 Entry list
 1994 Standings
 1994 Macau entry list
 www.motorsportsresults.com/berlines/Touring.asie.pdf 

Asia–Pacific Touring Car Championship
Asia-Pacific Touring Car Championship